Dabhoda is an area located in Gandhinagar, India. It is near to the under construction GIFT City.

Transport
Dabhoda railway station is the main railway station of Dabhoda. This is situated on Ahmedabad–Udaipur Line under the Ahmedabad railway division of Western Railway zone.

References

Neighbourhoods in Ahmedabad